Chlorocardium rodiei (greenheart) is a species of flowering plant in the family Lauraceae. It is one of two species in the genus Chlorocardium. It is native to Guyana and Suriname in South America. Other common names include cogwood, demerara greenheart, greenhart, ispingo moena, sipiri, bebeeru and bibiru.

It is an evergreen tree growing 15 to 30 m tall with a trunk diameter of 35 to 60 cm. The leaves are oppositely arranged and simple with smooth edges. The fruit is a drupe containing a single seed.

The cyclic bisbenzylisoquinoline alkaloid rodiasine was first isolated from this species. The wood is extremely hard and strong, so hard that it cannot be worked with standard tools. It is durable in marine conditions, so it is used to build docks and other structures, and it was an early choice for fly fishing rods. An estimated 15 to 28% of the original population has been harvested. The species' use as a commercial timber began in the late 18th century, but most of the harvesting has taken place since the introduction of chainsaws in 1967.

The Fram and the Endurance, made famous in the polar expeditions of Amundsen and Shackleton, were the two strongest wooden ships ever constructed and were sheathed in greenheart to prevent them from being crushed by ice.

It is often sought for construction projects in parts of the Caribbean, where wood ants are problematic in conventional pine wood construction. It was also used to build the dock gates in Liverpool, such as the Manchester dock gate. It has been used extensively as marine piling, since it is highly resistant to marine borers. It is also extremely dense, and does not float, therefore requiring special water transport arrangement, and is loaded onto specially constructed pontoons for transport to sawmill or direct shipping overseas. As sawn lumber it requires special treatment, and saws with tungsten carbide teeth, since standard steel saw blades cannot be maintained sharp enough to cut any reasonable quantity.

References

External links
Germplasm Resources Information Network: Chlorocardium
Virtual Tree Guide of the Guyanas: Chlorocardium herbarium specimens
Guyana Forestry Commission: Guyana Woods (pdf file; Greenheart, p. 7).

Lauraceae
Trees of Guyana
Trees of Suriname
Data deficient plants
Wood